Oak Island Life Saving Station is a historic life saving station located at Caswell Beach, Brunswick County, North Carolina.  It was built in 1889 by the United States Life-Saving Service.  It is a 1 1/2-story, front-gabled frame structure.  It features a large lookout tower projecting from the roof. Its siding trusswork, and brackets are characteristic of the Stick style. The station was sold to a private owner in 1938 and moved directly across the road from its original location. It was added to the National Register of Historic Places in 2000.

References

Government buildings on the National Register of Historic Places in North Carolina
Stick-Eastlake architecture in the United States
Government buildings completed in 1889
Buildings and structures in Brunswick County, North Carolina
National Register of Historic Places in Brunswick County, North Carolina